Karel S. San Juan is a Filipino Jesuit priest who currently serves as the University President of Ateneo de Zamboanga University. He belongs to the Philippine Province of the Society of Jesus.

Early life and education
Karel San Juan was born in Marikina, Philippines on June 16, 1965. He graduated with a Bachelor of Science in Mathematics degree from Ateneo de Manila University in 1986. He earned his master's degree in Development Management from the Asian Institute of Management in Makati, in 1993. He finished his Doctorate in Leadership Studies at the Gonzaga University, in Spokane, Washington, USA, in 2007.

Early career

San Juan started as an instructor and program officer for advocacy and social development offices in Ateneo de Manila University. He then expanded to being a consultant for strategic planning, development management, and organizational development for several government organizations in the Philippines including the Department of Environment and Natural Resources (1993 – 1994), Department of Trade and Industry (1993) and the Department of Agrarian Reform (1996 – 1997). In 1996, he taught management courses at the Asian Institute of Management.

As a Jesuit 
San Juan entered the Society of Jesus in May 1998 and was ordained to the priesthood in April 2010. He became a consultant and facilitator of the Ateneo de Manila University Office for Mission, Identity, and Organizational Development from 2000 – 2004. He also became program officer for the Center for Ignatian Spirituality (CIS-Philippines), and Simbahang Lingkod ng Bayan (SLB) from 2000 – 2002. He served as a Treasurer of the UGAT Foundation. He became executive director for the Emmaus Center for Psycho-Spiritual Formation in June 2007. Also in 2007, he earned his Doctorate in Leadership Studies at Gonzaga University.

San Juan is the president of the Ateneo de Zamboanga University since November 23, 2013. He is also a member of the Board of Trustees of Xavier University (Cagayan de Oro City),  Ateneo de Davao University, Ateneo de Manila University and the Emmaus Center for Psycho-Spiritual Formation.

As President 
The Ateneo de Zamboanga University Board of Trustees elected San Juan as the university's third president on February 23, 2013. As San Juan was in his final year of Jesuit spiritual formation, he did not assume the presidency until October 8, 2013. He was officially installed President of the Ateneo de Zamboanga University on November 23, 2013.

References

1965 births
Living people
Ateneo de Manila University alumni
Asian Institute of Management alumni
People from Marikina
Academic staff of Ateneo de Manila University
Academic staff of the Asian Institute of Management
21st-century Filipino Jesuits